Hospital is an 84-minute 1970 American documentary film directed by Frederick Wiseman, which explores the daily activities of the people at Metropolitan Hospital Center, a large-city hospital in New York City, with emphasis on its emergency ward and outpatient clinics.

The film won two Emmy Awards for Outstanding Achievement in News Documentary Programming - Individuals and Outstanding Achievement in News Documentary Programming - Programs. In 1994, it was selected for preservation in the United States National Film Registry as being deemed  "culturally, historically, or aesthetically significant". The film was selected for screening as part of the Cannes Classics section at the 2016 Cannes Film Festival.

Synopsis
The film follows hospital staff and a variety patients in an episodic manner. The film is highly observational, using no voice-over narration or interviews. Names are not formally given, and the hospital is only mentioned once as "Metropolitan" by a doctor on a phone call. The patients come from a variety of ethnic backgrounds and social classes, but most are poor and marginalized. Doctors, nurses, police officers, and social workers attempt to aid patients with medical care and social welfare. The staff's actions are often compassionate but limited by an overwhelmed public system. Among the patients are a man who fears he has cancer, a neglected toddler who fell out a window, an art student who ingested an unknown drug and is suffering a bad trip, a queer teenager trying to obtain welfare, and an elderly woman who has a pulmonary embolism and is in critical condition. A group of patients attending Catholic mass serves as the closing sequence.

See also
 List of American films of 1970

References

External links
Hospital essay by Barry Keith Grant on the National Film Registry website 
Hospital essay by Daniel Eagan in America's Film Legacy: The Authoritative Guide to the Landmark Movies in the National Film Registry, A&C Black, 2010 , pages 660-662 

1970 documentary films
1970 films
American documentary films
Black-and-white documentary films
Documentary films about health care
Documentary films about New York City
Films directed by Frederick Wiseman
United States National Film Registry films
American black-and-white films
Films set in hospitals
Healthcare in New York City
1970s American films